Thomas Fantl (9 December 1928 – 20 July 2001) was a German film director and screenwriter. He directed 23 films between 1964 and 1986. His 1964 film Time of the Innocent was entered into the 14th Berlin International Film Festival.

Filmography

 Time of the Innocent (1964) — based on a play by Siegfried Lenz
 Das Rendezvous (1965, TV film) — screenplay by Gabriele Wohmann
 Das Haus der sieben Balkone (1965, TV film) — based on the play La casa de los siete balcones by Alejandro Casona
 Wovon die Menschen leben (1965, TV film) — based on Leo Tolstoy's short story What Men Live By
 Die Gefährtin (1967, TV film) — based on a play by Jean-Louis Curtis
 Stunde der Nachtigallen (1967, TV film) — based on a play by James Parish
 In aller Stille (1967, TV film)
 Interpol: ... geborene Lipowski (1967, TV series episode)
 Das ausgefüllte Leben des Alexander Dubronski (1967, TV film) — screenplay by 
 Nachtcafé (1968, TV film)
 Wo man sich trifft (1968, TV film)
 Risiko für Weihnachtsmänner (1968, TV film) — based on a short story by Siegfried Lenz
 Hürdenlauf (1969, TV film) — screenplay by 
 Das schönste Fest der Welt (1969, TV film) — based on a radio play by Siegfried Lenz
 Van Gogh (1969, TV film) — based on a play by 
 Eine Rechnung, die nicht aufgeht (1969, TV film) — based on a story by Wolfdietrich Schnurre
 Alle hatten sich abgewandt (1970, TV film) — based on a story by Marek Hłasko
 Lieber Erwin (1970, TV film)
 Ludwig van Beethoven: "... in allem streng die Wahrheit" (1970, TV film)
 : Der Schuß (1970, TV series episode)
 Aufstiegschancen (1971, TV film) — screenplay by Max von der Grün
 Die Untaten des Fräulein Mikova (1971, TV film) — screenplay by 
 Sein Schutzengel (1971, TV film) — screenplay by Wolfdietrich Schnurre
  (1971, international anthology film)
 Freitags dienstbereit – Passage-Apotheke (1971, TV film)
 Alarm (1972, TV series)
 Gabriel (1973, TV film) — screenplay by 
  (1973, TV series, 6 episodes)
 Tatort: Eine todsichere Sache (1974, TV series episode)
 Das einsame Haus (1974, TV film) — screenplay by Ladislav Mňačko
 Keine Spürhunde für den Fiskus (1975, TV film)
 Der Knabe mit den 13 Vätern (1976, TV series, 13 episodes) — based on a novel by Alexander Roda Roda
 Der Haupttreffer (1977, TV film)
 Flucht (1977, TV film) — screenplay by Ladislav Mňačko
 Der Preis (1977, TV film) — based on the play The Price by Arthur Miller
 : Noch einmal Adam und Eva (1978, TV series episode)
 Die Magermilchbande (1979, TV series, 14 episodes)
 Eingriffe (1980, TV film)
 Die Aufgabe des Dr. med. Graefe (1982, TV film)
 Unterwegs nach Atlantis (1982, TV series, 13 episodes) — based on two novels by Johanna von Koczian
 Der Paragraphenwirt (1983, TV series, 13 episodes)
 Gauner im Paradies (1985, TV film) — screenplay by Maria Matray
 Stadttheater (1985, TV film) — based on a novel by 
 Alte Freundschaften (1989, TV film)
 Solo für Sudmann: Konfettimord (1997, TV series episode)

References

External links

1928 births
2001 deaths
German mass media people